is a Shinto shrine on Mount Atago, the northwest of Kyoto, Japan. Enshrined is Atago Gongen who protects Kyoto from fire. Shugendō practices and a place for worship are known from the eighth century. The late-Kamakura period Honden has been designated an Important Cultural Property. (Actually, the late-Kamakura period Honden is located at another Atago-jinja in Kameoka, to the northwest of Kyoto) Atago Jinja is the head of nine hundred Atago shrines throughout Japan.

Deities

Main hall

 Izanami no Mikoto
 Haniyasuhime no Mikoto
 Amenokumahito no Mikoto
 Wakumusubi no Kami
 Toyoukebime no Mikoto

Wakamiya

 Ikazuchi no Kami
 Kagutsuchi no Mikoto
 Hamushi no Kami

Okumiya

 Ōkuninushi

See also

 Atago Jinja (Tokyo)
 Shinbutsu shūgō
 Honji suijaku
 Tsukinowa-dera

References

Further reading

External links
 Atago Jinja homepage

Shinto shrines in Kyoto
 
8th-century Shinto shrines
Beppyo shrines